José Jesús Villa Pelayo (Caracas, 1962) is a Venezuelan poet, essayist, lawyer and political analyst. He has written the following books: Una hiedra negra para Sashne. 1990, Nueva York. 1992, Mariana de Coimbra.1999, Las arpías vuelan sobre Manhattan. 2006, Diario de Alejandría. 2007.

External links
 Altri Termini
Kalathos/Antología
Bilinguismo estético
 Editoriales venezolanas
 Enigmas del Poder
 Casa de las Américas
Escritores venezolanos

1962 births
Living people
People from Caracas
Venezuelan male poets
20th-century Venezuelan lawyers
Venezuelan essayists
Male essayists